Forensic Services (SCD 4) is a unit of the Metropolitan Police of London, England. Part of the Specialist Crime Directorate, their duties range from evidence recovery following burglaries to anti-terrorism work. It is divided into six units:

Forensic Services Command Unit for Territorial Policing is responsible for the examination of all crime scenes. The 32 London Boroughs are divided into four "Links", with each Link covering eight boroughs. A "Borough Forensic Manager" has a team of "Assistant Forensic Practitioners" (AFPs) who examine crime scenes and support "Crime Scene Managers" at more serious crime scenes, such as murder. A Forensic Intelligence Unit links evidence recovered from different crime scenes.
Forensic Investigation - Specialist Crime conducts forensic investigations of homicide, armed robbery and any other crime that falls within the remit of SCD.
Specialist Evidence Recovery Imaging Services provides photographic services to the Met Police. It responds to major crime scenes, terrorist events and public order and CBRN (Chemical, Biological, Radiological, Nuclear) incidents.
The Fingerprint Bureau compares finger and palm marks from crime scenes against offender databases, arrestee fingerprints against databases of unidentified marks, and fingerprints of suspects specified by investigating officers. The Bureau is responsible for archiving material from investigations and is also responsible for comparing the fingerprints of all arrestees in London in order to establish their identity. The Bureau also retrieves finger and palm marks by chemical and physical means and co-ordinates fingerprint evidence for presentation in court.
The Evidence Recovery Unit provides chemical treatment prior to fingerprint, DNA and firearms examinations and use of specialised photographic lighting techniques.
The Counter-Terrorism Team is responsible for retrieving evidence from terrorist activities.

References

Metropolitan Police units